Samuel Rahamin Levy (1929–2012) was a Zimbabwean businessman and property developer best known for his construction of the Sam Levy's Village shopping mall in Borrowdale, a suburb of Harare, in 1990. A self-made billionaire, at the time of his death he was reputed to be one of the richest people in Zimbabwe.

Background

Levy was born to a Jewish family in Que Que (now Kwekwe) on 9 October 1929, and educated at Prince Edward School in Salisbury (as Harare was called until 1982). He founded and chaired Macey's Stores Limited, a large supermarket group, in the 1960s. In September 1973 he purchased Duly's car showroom on Angwa Street, Salisbury, for US$1.5 million. He converted the site into a department store and later a shopping centre, the Ximex Mall, which he sold to the National Social Security Authority (NSSA) in the late 1990s. He successfully stood in the Salisbury council elections in 1975, and served as a councillor for Ward 8, comprising the city's southern district of Waterfalls, until 1979.

According to a 2014 retrospective on his life published by the Herald newspaper, he "was never short of controversy". He reportedly built Sam Levy's Village without the support of the local community because they didn't want a shopping centre in s residential neighborhood. In 2000, 50 motorbikes marked "police" were discovered at Levy's farm near Harare, but he was fined only Z$200. The bikes were bought in 1997 at a virtual "tag sale" from the British Consulate as they liquidated assets out of Hong Kong in the transfer of sovereignty back to mainland China.

Sam Levy's Village was designed in such a way that it has since been dubbed a "Little England". It includes buildings resembling English cottages and a clock tower similar to Big Ben, and originally issued its security guards with uniforms similar to those of British "bobbies". In 2012 Sam Levy was posthumously honoured with a Lifetime Achievement Award at the Victor Night Awards and Empretec recognised him as one of the Most Influential Entrepreneurs in post-independent Zimbabwe.

“He loved passionately and deeply, and was very protective. No one could touch anyone he loved, and he made everybody know it. He reminded everyone he met, respect and honour your parents and don’t fight with your brothers and sisters,” read his eulogy.

“Family is family” and “blood is thicker than water”, he was quoted as saying.

Sam Levy was also involved in various charities. His friend, Kiki Divaris, of the Miss Zimbabwe Trust said of his death: “He was a generous individual who always supported me in my endeavours including the Child Survival Trust. He was a hard working, innovative and successful man who did a lot for Zimbabwe.”

He always said, "when I see a good idea, I take it and bring it back to Zimbabwe". His intention was always to let people there get a taste of what was only available overseas. He had so much pride in bringing new things to his country. When things looked bleak, he kept building. He never gave up on the country or its people, and he made it known that he was here to stay. He created a legacy in this country for the country. He made it very clear that he was a part of the team to carry this country forward, and he did so proudly and loudly.

“It was called Sam Levy’s Village for a reason. He wanted his legacy to be there for the people and he was proud to be a part of it, and wanted it to continue even after his death. Zimbabwe inspired him, and was his anchor.”

Sam Levy’s head of security, Mr Charles Kapfupi, described the businessman as a hard-working principled man.  “He was not a clock-watcher. He believed in working hard hence, his success,” Mr Kapfupi said, adding that he was one of the biggest land developers in Zimbabwe.  One of Levy’s workers, Mr Adam Makorona, who served him for over 12 years, said he had been deeply saddened by his death.
A businesswoman said: “I knew him very well and he used to call himself ‘Kanyuchi’ (bee) because he used to say he knew how to make honey (money).”
Several people also expressed sadness in social media.

One of them said, “A very humble man, I liked everything about him.”
In 1971, Levy’s wife Gloria was once quoted saying, “He is not the ogre most people think he is, really he is gentle-natured.”
Levy, the owner of the multi-billion-dollar Sam Levy’s Village in Borrowdale, among other business empires in the country, was born in Kwekwe and went to Prince Edward School.

In the 1960s, he was the founder and chairman of a large supermarket group, Macey’s Stores Limited, which went public in the 1970's.  In the early 1980's Levy bought back every share and sold the company to a private conglomerate. This was historic for its time.  Levy faced heavy challenges from his Macey's days when he started a price war by slashing the then standardized liquor prices.  This earned him the nickname “Cut-price king”. After he sold Macey's Levy built Sam Levy's Village, still the largest and most prestigious shopping mall in the country which now also features two supermarkets, gas station, movie theater complex, office park and office tower.  

Levy died from cancer at his home in the Harare suburb of Avondale on 5 June 2012. He was survived by his wife, four children, Julia, Isaac, Maurice and Raymond, and seven grandchildren, and buried at Warren Hills Jewish Cemetery in Harare. The Vice President of the Republic of  Zimbabwe, Joice Mujuru, expressed sincere condolences to the family having been a dear friend.  There was a strong friendship between Sam and her late husband, General Solomon Mujuru. Sam assisted the General when he was involved in a helicopter crash and broke his vertebrae when he was still in the army. Media, Information and Publicity Minister, Webster Shamu, described Levy as a “hardworking and shrewd businessman”. Later that year he was posthumously honoured with a Lifetime Achievement Award at the Victor Night Awards and recognised by the UN's EMPRETEC programme as one of the most influential Zimbabwean entrepreneurs since 1980. His eldest son, Isaac, took over the family's business operations.

References

1929 births
2012 deaths
Alumni of Prince Edward School
Deaths from cancer in Zimbabwe
Rhodesian city councillors
People from Kwekwe
Rhodesian businesspeople
Rhodesian Jews
White Rhodesian people
20th-century Zimbabwean businesspeople
Zimbabwean Jews